The Caballos Novaculite is a geologic formation in Texas. It preserves fossils dating back to the Devonian period.

See also

 List of fossiliferous stratigraphic units in Texas
 Paleontology in Texas

References
 

Geology of Texas
Devonian System of North America